In June 2020 it was confirmed that season 4 of Dana White's Contender Series would commence in August 2020 and in the US would be exclusive to ESPN+, ESPN's new over-the-top subscription package. In April 2020, the schedule was elaborated, the series beginning on August 4, 2020 and ending on September 1, 2020.

Week 1 - August 4

Contract awards 
The following fighters were awarded contracts with the UFC:
Dustin Jacoby, Uroš Medić, and Jordan Leavitt

Week 2 - August 11

Contract awards 
The following fighters were awarded contracts with the UFC:
Dustin Stoltzfus, Adrian Yanez, Cory McKenna, T.J. Laramie, and Impa Kasanganay

Week 3 - August 18

Contract awards 
The following fighters were awarded contracts with the UFC:
Louis Cosce, Cheyanne Buys, Orion Cosce, and Josh Parisian

Week 4 - August 25

Contract awards 
The following fighters were awarded contracts with the UFC:
Jamie Pickett, Rafael Alves, Jeff Molina, and Collin Huckbody

Week 5 - September 1

Contract awards 
The following fighters were awarded contracts with the UFC:
Jimmy Flick, Ronnie Lawrence, and William Knight

Week 6 - September 8

Contract awards 
The following fighters were awarded contracts with the UFC:
Phil Hawes, Drako Rodriguez, Tafon Nchukwi, and Aliaskhab Khizriev

Week 7 - September 15

Contract awards 
The following fighters were awarded contracts with the UFC:
Jordan Williams, Collin Anglin, and Danyelle Wolf

Week 8 - November 4

Contract awards 
The following fighters were awarded contracts with the UFC:
Carlos Ulberg, Ignacio Bahamondes, Luis Saldaña, and Jared Vanderaa

Week 9 - November 10

Contract awards 
The following fighters were awarded contracts with the UFC:
Natan Levy, Nikolas Motta, and Luana Pinheiro

Week 10 - November 17

Contract awards 
The following fighters were awarded contracts with the UFC:
JP Buys, Gloria de Paula, Tucker Lutz, and Victoria Leonardo

References

Ultimate Fighting Championship television series